Eoghan O'Gara (born 24 September 1985) is a Gaelic footballer who played as a forward at senior level for the Dublin county team. O'Gara attended St. Josephs BNS primary school in Terenure.

Playing career
O'Gara made his Championship debut for Dublin coming on at half-time in place of Kevin McManamon. He had an immediate impact on the game, causing trouble for the Wexford defence in Dublin's comeback in the Leinster quarter final.  O'Gara made a substitute appearance for Dublin in the Leinster semi-final defeat to Meath, which proved to be Dublin's biggest defeat ever to their rivals. This ended Dublin's five-year reign as Leinster champions.

Dublin and O'Gara went on to play in the qualifiers at the second round stage. O'Gara scored his first inter county point for Dublin against Tipperary in the second round of the 2010 qualifiers at Croke Park. O'Gara scored a 2-01 in Dublin's victory over Leinster finalists Louth in the final round of the qualifiers at Croke Park. This was O'Gara's highest scoring game for Dublin and his first Championship goal. O'Gara scored a crucial goal against Tyrone during the 2010 All-Ireland quarter final victory. O'Gara scored 3-2 in the 2010 All-Ireland Senior Football Championship.

On 5 November 2019, O'Gara officially confirmed his retirement from inter-county football.

In 2022, he transferred to Wexford GAA club Shelmaliers, his wife Elaine's club.

Honours
 Leinster Senior Football Championship (9): 2008, 2011, 2012, 2013, 2014, 2015, 2016, 2017, 2018
 All-Ireland Senior Football Championship (7): 2011, 2013, 2015, 2016, 2017, 2018, 2019
 National Football League (5): 2013, 2014, 2015, 2016, 2018,

References

1985 births
Living people
DCU Gaelic footballers
Dublin inter-county Gaelic footballers
Gaelic football forwards
Templeogue Synge Street Gaelic footballers
Sportspeople from Dublin (city)
Winners of seven All-Ireland medals (Gaelic football)